Mickelsson's Ghosts is John Gardner's final novel, published in 1982. It follows Peter Mickelsson, former football player and current Professor of Philosophy at Binghamton University. Mickelsson is driven, opinionated, probably a drunk, definitely bankrupt, and perhaps going mad. During his personal descent, which he seems powerless to stop, he buys a farmhouse in northern Pennsylvania's Endless Mountains, which seems to be haunted by the ghosts of an incestuous family. The self-destructive Mickelsson has several affairs (including one with a young prostitute, and one with a fellow faculty member who attempts to help him put his life back together), inadvertently causes a death, and becomes involved with a sectarian religious group which may be imagined.

The ghosts of the title refer not just to individuals, but types. Although traditional ghost stories stick to one of three different kinds of ghosts, Gardner uniquely populates this novel with all three:  real supernatural entities, "psychological" ghosts that originate in the imaginings of a character, and supernatural-seeming occurrences that have natural explanations.  Although Mickelsson seems irredeemable, evident throughout is Gardner's sympathy toward all his characters, however dissipated.

Book reviewers widely panned it. Kirkus Reviews called the book "a fascinating, oddly depressing failure". Some later literary critics have acclaimed the book as one of Gardner's best.

Bibliography
; reprint New Directions Publishing, 2008, 

1982 American novels
Novels by John Gardner (American writer)
Binghamton University
Novels set in Pennsylvania
Endless Mountains